Sam and Friends is an American live-action/puppet sketch comedy television series and a lead-in to The Tonight Show created by puppeteer Jim Henson and his eventual wife Jane Nebel. It was taped and aired twice daily as a local series in Washington, D.C., on WRC-TV in black and white, and later color, on weeknights from May 9, 1955, to December 15, 1961. Most of the original episodes were never recorded, and some that were have been lost. A few surviving episodes can be viewed at the Paley Center for Media but many can also be found on video websites like YouTube, such as those digitally archived by The Jim Henson Company. Some have been documented by either the Henson Archives or newspaper articles published while the show was still on air.

Plot
The series focused mostly on Sam, a bald-headed, big-eared human who escaped the harshness of everyday life with the help of abstract friends that he created based on parts of his life. His friends included Yorick, Harry the Hipster, Professor Madcliffe, Chicken Liver, and a lizard-like character named Kermit (who later evolved into Kermit the Frog).

Early in its run, the show mostly featured the puppets lip-synching to popular songs of the day (if the song was by a female performer, the puppet would wear a wig while singing). Later, formal sketches were drawn up, many spoofing well-known television shows at the time, including the series which followed Sam and Friends in the Washington market, The Huntley-Brinkley Report.

A popular early sketch that would be used often in subsequent Henson productions was "Inchworm", in which a character, often Kermit, would nibble on what looked like a worm, but would ultimately turn out to be the tongue or nose of the monster Big V, who would devour him.

Bob Payne once substituted for Jim Henson while he was in Europe. Jerry Juhl also worked on the show toward the end of its run where he substituted for Jane Henson. Starting in 1959, advertisements for Esskay Meats would appear at the end of the show, as well as Wilkins Coffee (the latter featured two Muppets created exclusively for the spots, "Wilkins" and "Wontkins").

While Payne, Juhl, and Jane Henson all puppeteered in the series alongside Jim Henson, Jim provided all of the voices himself (unless the voices were taken from a record).

Characters

 Sam (performed by Jim Henson) – A bald-headed humanoid-like character who is the main character. Only footage of him lip-syncing to a song currently survives.  His head was made from papier-mâché.
 Kermit (performed by Jim Henson) – A reptilian-amphibious creature. He was prominently featured in many sketches that lead him to popularity, though he would not be referred to as a frog until a decade later.
 Harry the Hipster (performed by Jim Henson) – A beatnik. He resembled a black sock puppet with shades and spoke in a hip slang. Harry was one of the first Muppets designed and built by Jim Henson.
 Yorick (performed by Jim Henson) – A voracious puppet that resembled a rock head. Yorick has been known for appearing with supporting Muppets, whom he would attempt to eat. His puppet was made of papier-mâché with a tube in his mouth that allowed him to swallow things.
 Professor Madcliffe (performed by Jim Henson) – A tall-headed professor with big eyes and a mustache. He had a loud and energetic personality. He made most of his appearances in commercials.
 Chicken Liver (performed by Jim Henson) – A humanoid character with a tall head and a big nose. He has been described as "a dramatic storyteller", and believed that the show lacked culture.
 Hank and Frank – Two bald humanoids that served as the show's bit players. They took on the roles of Chet Huntley and David Brinkley in a spoof interview with Kermit.
 Mushmellon – A small yellow monster with a permanent grimace. He was a favorite among younger audiences.
 Icky Gunk – A sinister-looking green snake-like character sporting a pair of arms.
 Henrietta (performed by Jerry Juhl) – A pink female creature of indeterminable species. 
 Moldy Hay – A humanoid character with orange-red skin, a big nose, and hair over his eyes.
 Omar (performed by Jim Henson) – A beaked humanoid with a papier-mâché face. He was described as "the nomadic type".
 Pierre the French Rat (performed by Jim Henson) – He was one of Jim Henson's first puppets. Pierre was embodied as a puppet made from plastic wood.
 Bernice (performed by Bob Payne)

Cast

Episodes
 Chef Omar: Omar prepares a chef salad, which blows up in his face when he serves it flaming.
 Hunger is From: Lip-synching to "Hunger is From", Yorick details his midnight snacking while eating a plate full of food.
 Huntley and Brinkley: In a parody of The Huntley-Brinkley Report, Kermit hosts an interview with NBC News anchormen Chet Huntley and David Brinkley (as Hank and Frank).
 Poison to Poison: Lip-synching to the Spike Jones track "Poisen to Poisen", Harry the Hipster (as "Ed Burrow") interviews Chicken Liver (as Alfred Hitchcock) in his rather horrifying home.
 Powder-Burn: A pun-filled Gunsmoke parody with Marshall Dilly (Chicken Liver) preparing for a showdown with Black Bart (Yorick) which results in a game of chess.
 Visual Thinking (1959): In a mix of puppetry and animation, Harry demonstrates the Art of Visual Thinking to Kermit—and what it does to you once it gets out of control.
 The Westerners: Lip-synching to a recording of Bob and Ray's act The Westerners, Kermit and Chicken Liver play two cowboys who are having a little trouble getting off their horses.
 Weather Warehouse: Harry demonstrates to a skeptical Kermit his new business for selling weather, and gives him a tour of the warehouse.

Songs
 C'est Si Bon: In a French village setting, Moldy Hay lip-synchs to Stan Freberg's rendition of "C'est Si Bon", with Hank and Frank repeating his dialogue too literally as a backup choir.
 Glow Worm: Humming along to "The Glow-Worm", Kermit is bugged by some inchworm-like fingers and is later met with a human hand.
 A Horse Named Bill: Kermit lip-synchs and plays the banjo to a recording of "A Horse Named Bill."
 I've Got You Under My Skin: Icky Gunk, and Hank and Frank serve as chorus singers in a lip-synched rendition of Stan Freberg's "I've Got You Under My Skin" while Kermit, in spoken dialogue, messes up the lyrics.
 Singin' in the Rain: A little girl Muppet lip-synchs to an uptempo version of "Singin' in the Rain" as water begins to pour. Eventually, she is submerged in a water-filled bucket.
 That Old Black Magic (1957): Kermit and Sam lip-synch to a recording of "That Old Black Magic" by Louis Prima and Keely Smith. To date, this is the only surviving Sam and Friends episode to feature Sam himself. 
 The Yellow Rose of Texas: Kermit lip-synchs to a Stan Freberg recording of "The Yellow Rose of Texas" and deals with an out-of-control drummer.
 Final Goodbye Episode (December 15, 1961): Kermit sings a song, then discusses the end of the series with Harry—who blows up all the scenery and equipment since they won't need it anymore.

Later appearances
Sam and Friends is mentioned in chapter 2 of Kermit the Frog's book Before You Leap, under the heading of "My First Big Splash".

Henrietta appeared in The Muppets on Puppets during Rowlf the Dog's mixed-up fairy tale sketch portraying the fairy godmother. In this appearance, Henrietta was also performed by Jerry Juhl.

Sam, Harry the Hipster, and Yorick appeared in The Muppets: A Celebration of 30 Years.

In Spring 2010, early puppet characters were rejoined in Henson Alternative's Stuffed and Unstrung, for two musical pieces that aren't improvised and no cuss words.

In August 2010, Jane Henson donated ten puppets from the show (including the original Kermit) to the Smithsonian Institution's National Museum of American History.

In July 2016, Hyattsville, Maryland, installed a memorial to Jim Henson in the city's Magruder Park, featuring a large planter embossed with images of characters from Sam and Friends and benches inscribed with quotes from Henson.

Yorick made a visual appearance in the 2021 Muppet Babies episode "Summer's Disaster-Piece", where he replaces the head on Thomas Gainsborough's painting The Blue Boy.

References

External links

1955 American television series debuts
1961 American television series endings
1950s American sketch comedy television series
1960s American sketch comedy television series
American television shows featuring puppetry
Black-and-white American television shows
English-language television shows
Television series by The Jim Henson Company